Dave Erickson is an American television writer and producer best known for co-creating Fear the Walking Dead with Robert Kirkman, for which he was showrunner until the end of the third season; he stepped down in order to make more shows for AMC. He also created the television series Canterbury's Law, and wrote and produced for television series Sons of Anarchy and Low Winter Sun. He most recently signed an overall deal with MRC.

Writing

Canterbury's Law
 1.01 – "Pilot"

Sons of Anarchy
 1.07 – "Old Bones"
 1.11 – "Capybara" (co-written with Kurt Sutter)
 2.03 – "Fix" 
 2.12 – "The Culling" (co-written with Kurt Sutter)
 3.02 – "Oiled" (co-written with Kurt Sutter)
 3.13 – "NS" (co-written with Kurt Sutter) 
 4.02 – "Booster" (co-written with Chris Collins)
 4.05 – "Brick" (co-written with Brady Dahl)
 4.12 – "Burnt and Purged Away" (co-written with Kurt Sutter)

Low Winter Sun
 1.03 – "No Rounds"
 1.08 – "Revelations"

Marco Polo
 1.06 – "White Moon"

Fear the Walking Dead
 1.01 – "Pilot" (co-written with Robert Kirkman)
 1.06 – "The Good Man" (co-written with Robert Kirkman)
 2.01 – "Monster"
 2.15 – "North"
 3.01 – "Eye of the Beholder"
 3.09 – "Minotaur" (co-written with Mike Zunic)
 3.16 – "Sleigh Ride" (co-written with Mark Richard)

References

External links 
 

Living people
American male screenwriters
American television writers
Place of birth missing (living people)
Year of birth missing (living people)
American male television writers
American television producers
21st-century American screenwriters
21st-century American male writers
Williams College alumni